Stones is the seventh studio album by Neil Diamond, recorded and released in 1971. It was one of the biggest hit recordings of his career. The conductors and arrangers were Lee Holdridge, Marty Paich and Larry Muhoberac.

The cover photo was taken at Luxford House, Crowborough, East Sussex. The house was occupied at the time by rock music manager Tony Stratton-Smith.

Early copies of the LP album featured a picture label and a unique version of the cover with a grommet-string style closure on the back. The cover itself was styled as an envelope that opened from the top. This was later abandoned and replaced with a standard side-opening sleeve.

Inspired by the experience of a failed screen test for a film about rebel comic Lenny Bruce, " 'I Am...I Said' would ultimately turn out to be the single most challenging and time-consuming song that [Diamond] ever wrote." And while "it took four months every day, all day...It was a daily battle to put that song on paper...but when it was done, it turned out to be one of the most satisfying songs I had ever written."

Track listing

References
2. "He Is...I Say" by David Wild (DeCapo Press, 2008)

1971 albums
Neil Diamond albums
Uni Records albums
Albums arranged by Lee Holdridge
Albums arranged by Larry Muhoberac
Albums arranged by Marty Paich
Albums conducted by Larry Muhoberac
Albums conducted by Lee Holdridge
Albums conducted by Marty Paich
Albums produced by Tom Catalano